
Gmina Burzenin is a rural gmina (administrative district) in Sieradz County, Łódź Voivodeship, in central Poland.

The gmina contains part of the protected area called Warta-Widawka Landscape Park.

Villages
Gmina Burzenin contains the villages and settlements of Antonin, Będków, Biadaczew, Brzeźnica, Burzenin, Działy, Grabówka, Gronów, Jarocice, Kamilew, Kamionka, Kolonia Niechmirów, Kopanina, Krępica, Ligota, Majaczewice, Marianów, Niechmirów, Nieczuj, Prażmów, Redzeń Drugi, Redzeń Pierwszy, Ręszew, Rokitowiec, Sambórz, Strumiany, Strzałki, Świerki, Szczawno, Tyczyn, Waszkowskie, Witów, Wola Będkowska, Wola Majacka, Wolnica Grabowska and Wolnica Niechmirowska.

Neighbouring gminas
Gmina Burzenin is bordered by the gminas of Brzeźnio, Konopnica, Sieradz, Widawa, Zapolice and Złoczew.

References
Polish official population figures 2006

Burzenin
Sieradz County